Yurya is an urban locality (an urban-type settlement) in Yuryansky District of Kirov Oblast, Russia. Population:

Gallery

References

Urban-type settlements in Kirov Oblast